Spyridon "Spyros" Taliadouros (born 26 March 1956) is a Greek politician who served as New Democracy member of the Hellenic Parliament for Karditsa. He was educated at the University of Athens (Bachelor's, 1980; PhD, 1986) and King's College London (Master's, 1981).

References

External links
 Personal website

1956 births
Living people
National and Kapodistrian University of Athens alumni
Alumni of King's College London
Greek MPs 1989 (June–November)
Greek MPs 1989–1990
Greek MPs 1990–1993
Greek MPs 2000–2004
Greek MPs 2004–2007
Greek MPs 2007–2009
Greek MPs 2009–2012
Greek MPs 2012 (May)
Greek MPs 2012–2014
New Democracy (Greece) politicians
Politicians from Athens